Konaran (also Romanized as Konārān and Kanārān; also known as Konārū) is a village in Sirch Rural District, Shahdad District, Kerman County, Kerman Province, Iran. At the 2006 census, its population was 18, in 5 families.

References 

Populated places in Kerman County